John McKinley Gough (born 25 September 1929) is a British former sports shooter.

Sport shooting career
Gough competed at the 1976 Summer Olympics. He represented England and won a bronze medal in the centre fire pistol pair with John Cooke, at the 1982 Commonwealth Games in Brisbane, Queensland, Australia.

References

1929 births
Living people
Sportspeople from London
British male sport shooters
Olympic shooters of Great Britain
Shooters at the 1976 Summer Olympics
Commonwealth Games medallists in shooting
Commonwealth Games bronze medallists for England
Shooters at the 1982 Commonwealth Games
Medallists at the 1982 Commonwealth Games